Michel Colombier (23 May 1939 – 14 November 2004) was a French composer, arranger, and conductor.

Career
Colombier wrote the scores of several motion pictures and TV productions. He also wrote chamber music and ballets. With composer Pierre Henry he wrote music for Messe pour le temps présent, a piece created by choreographer Maurice Béjart in 1967. He released an album on A&M Records, "Wings", in 1971, which included a collaboration with Lani Hall on lead vocal, his song "We Could Be Flying", with lyrics by Paul Williams. Recorded in Paris, with Colombier on piano, it was also included on the album "Sun Down Lady", Lani Halls' first solo album after her years as lead singer for Sergio Mendes and Brazil 66,  released in 1972 on A&M Records.

The music for which Colombier was perhaps most famous was the piece Emmanuel, named after and written in memory of his young son, who died in his infancy.  It was used by the French television channel Antenne 2 (now known as France 2), alongside an 80-second animation known as Les Hommes Volants (The Flying Men), by Jean Michel Folon, to signal the beginning and end of their broadcast day between the years of 1975 and 1983.

Death

Colombier's death from cancer came shortly after midnight on November 14, 2004.   He left behind a widow, Dana Colombier, with whom he fathered two children.  He is interred in Westwood Village Memorial Park Cemetery, Los Angeles, CA.

Selected film scores
 Anna (1967 film) (1967)
 Every Bastard a King (1968)
 Colossus: The Forbin Project (1970)
 Law Breakers (1971)
 Un flic (1972)
 The Inheritor (1973)
 Paul and Michelle (1974)
 Steel (1979)
 Une chambre en ville (1982)
 Against All Odds (1984)
 Purple Rain (1984)
 White Nights (1985)
 The Money Pit (1986)
 Ruthless People (1986)
 The Golden Child (1986)
 Surrender (1987)
 The Wild Pair (1987)
 The Couch Trip (1988)
 Cop (1988)
 Satisfaction (1988)
 Who's Harry Crumb? (1989)
 Out Cold (1989)
 Loverboy (1989)
 Asterix and the Big Fight (1989)
 Impulse (1990)
 Buried Alive (1990)
 Midnight Cabaret (1990)
 New Jack City (1991)
 The Dark Wind (1991)
 Strictly Business (1991)
 Deep Cover (1992)
 Folks! (1992)
 Posse (1993)
 The Program (1993)
 Major League II (1994)
 Élisa (1995)
 Mary & Tim (1996)
 Barb Wire (1996)
 Meet Wally Sparks (1997)
 Kiss of Fire (1998)
 Woo (1998)
 How Stella Got Her Groove Back (1998)
 Pros & Cons (1999)
 Screwed (2000)
 Swept Away (2002)

References

External links
 
 

1939 births
2004 deaths
20th-century American male musicians
20th-century American musicians
20th-century French conductors (music)
20th-century French male musicians
Deaths from cancer in California
Eurovision Song Contest conductors
French ballet composers
French expatriates in the United States
French film score composers
French male conductors (music)
French music arrangers
French songwriters
Male songwriters
French male film score composers
Musicians from Santa Monica, California
Musicians from Lyon
Varèse Sarabande Records artists
French emigrants to the United States